The Porto Alegre Symphony Orchestra is a Brazilian orchestra based in Porto Alegre, in the state of Rio Grande do Sul. It was founded in 1950 under the direction of the Hungarian conductor Pablo Komlós. Since January 22, 1965, the Porto Alegre Symphony Orchestra is a foundation funded by the state government of Rio Grande do Sul.

A Symphonic Chorus is integrated with the orchestra in some concerts. 

The orchestra today comprises around 100 professional musicians.

Artistic Directors
 1950/1978 - Pablo Komlós
 1978/1980 - David Machado
 1981/1987 - Eleazar de Carvalho
 1987/1989 - Flavio Chamis
 1990/1991 - Tulio Belardi & Arlindo Teixeira
 1991/1992 - Eleazar de Carvalho
 1992/1993 - David Machado
 1995/1998 - Claudio Ribeiro
 1999/2001 - Tiago Flores
 2001/2002 - Ion Bressan
 2003/2010 - Isaac Karabtchevsky
 2010/2014 - Tiago Flores
 2015/present - Evandro Matté

References

External links
Orquestra Sinfônica de Porto Alegre official website
Concerts
OSPA conducted by Manfredo Schmiedt with Yamandu Costa (acoustic guitar) performing Aragao and Costa's Popular Fantasy for Seven Strings Guitar and Orchestra at the Farroupilha Park.

Musical groups established in 1950
Brazilian orchestras
Musical groups from Porto Alegre